Visakha Steel Employees' Congress, the recognized trade union at the Visakhapatnam Steel Plant, in Visakhapatnam, India. VSEC is affiliated to the Indian National Trade Union Congress. The general secretary of VSEC is M. Rajashekar and the President is Gandham Venkata Rao.

Trade unions in India
Trade unions of the Visakhapatnam Steel Plant
Indian National Trade Union Congress
Year of establishment missing